Abdulkarimovo is the name of several rural localities in Russia.

Modern localities
Abdulkarimovo, Alsheyevsky District, Bashkortostan, a village in Abdrashitovskiy Selsoviet of Alsheyevsky District in Bashkortostan
Abdulkarimovo, Baymaksky District, Bashkortostan, a village in Abdulkarimovskiy Selsoviet of Baymaksky District in Bashkortostan
Abdulkarimovo, Yermekeyevsky District, Bashkortostan, a village in Yermekeyevsky Selsoviet of Yermekeyevsky District in Bashkortostan